Cootharaba may refer to:

Lake Cootharaba
Cootharaba, Queensland